The Battle of Ölper may refer to one of two battles at Ölper, now a district of Brunswick in Lower Saxony:

Battle of Ölper (1761)
Battle of Ölper (1809)